Captain William Villiers-Stuart (21 August 1804 – 7 November 1873), was a British soldier and Member of Parliament.

Born William Stuart, he was the second son of Lord Henry Stuart, third son of John Stuart, 1st Marquess of Bute of Castletown, County Kilkenny, Ireland. His mother was Lady Gertrude Amelia, only child and heiress of George Mason-Villiers, 2nd Earl Grandison, while Lord Stuart de Decies was his elder brother. In 1822 he assumed by Royal licence the additional surname of Villiers.

Villiers-Stuart was a captain in the 12th Lancers. In 1835 he was returned to parliament as one of two representatives for County Waterford, a seat he held until 1847. He was appointed High Sheriff of County Kilkenny for 1848–49.

Villiers-Stuart married Catherine, daughter of Michael Cock of Castletown, in 1833. They had several children. He died in November 1873, aged 69. His wife survived him by six years and died in September 1879.

References

External links

1804 births
1873 deaths
William
Members of the Parliament of the United Kingdom for County Waterford constituencies (1801–1922)
UK MPs 1835–1837
UK MPs 1837–1841
UK MPs 1841–1847
12th Royal Lancers officers
William Villiers-Stuart
High Sheriffs of County Kilkenny